Tyler Isaiah Huntley (born February 3, 1998), nicknamed "Snoop", is an American football quarterback for the Baltimore Ravens of the National Football League (NFL). He played college football for the Utah Utes, leading them to two South Division titles in 2018 and 2019 before being signed by the Ravens as an undrafted free agent in 2020, where he earned Pro Bowl honors in 2022.

Early years
Huntley attended Hallandale High School in Hallandale Beach, Florida. During his career, he passed for 9,053 yards and 106 touchdowns. As a senior, he was the Florida Gatorade Football Player of the Year. He committed to the University of Utah to play college football, where he played alongside high school teammate Zack Moss.

College career

As a true freshman at Utah in 2016, Huntley played in four games as a backup to Troy Williams. Huntley was named the starter over Williams in 2017. He started 10 games, missing three due to injury and completed 199 of 312 passes for 2,411 yards, 15 touchdowns and 10 interceptions. Huntley started the first nine games of his junior year in 2018, missing the last five due to injury, finishing the season by completing 150 of 234 passes for 1,788 yards, 12 touchdowns and six interceptions. He returned as the starter his senior year in 2019, finishing his college career with 14 games, leading the Utes to the Pac-12 final, passing for 3,092 yards and 19 touchdowns with just four interceptions, and rushing for another five touchdowns.

College statistics

Professional career

Baltimore Ravens

2020 season
Huntley signed with the Baltimore Ravens as an undrafted free agent on April 30, 2020. He was waived on September 5, 2020, and signed to the team's practice squad the next day. Following injuries/COVID-19 issues from the Ravens' three other quarterbacks, he was elevated to the active roster on December 2, December 19, December 26, and January 2, 2021, for the team's week 12, 15, 16, and 17 games against the Pittsburgh Steelers, Jacksonville Jaguars, New York Giants, and Cincinnati Bengals, and reverted to the practice squad after each game. He made his NFL debut in the fourth quarter against the Jacksonville Jaguars in week 15, when Huntley stepped in for starter Lamar Jackson and went 2 of 4 for seven yards, along with four rushes for 18 rushing yards (which included two kneel downs) as the Ravens won 40–14. Against the Bengals, as the game quickly became a Ravens blowout, he entered the game late in the third quarter. He completed one pass attempt for eight yards while rushing six times for five yards as the Ravens won 38–3. He was elevated again on January 9 and 15 for the team's wild card and divisional playoff games against the Tennessee Titans and Buffalo Bills, and reverted to the practice squad again following each game. Huntley played the entire fourth quarter of the Bills game after Jackson was knocked out with a concussion, going 6 of 13 with 60 passing yards, along with three rushes for 32 yards, as the Ravens lost 3–17.

2021 season

On January 18, 2021, Huntley signed a reserve/futures contract with the Ravens. Huntley had three rushing attempts for ten yards in the Ravens' blowout win over the Los Angeles Chargers in Week 6, and came in to relieve Lamar Jackson during the Ravens’ blowout loss to the Cincinnati Bengals in Week 7, finishing the game with 39 yards passing, going 5 for 11. Huntley got his first NFL start on November 21, 2021, when Jackson was not able to play due to a non-Covid illness against the Chicago Bears. Huntley threw for 219 yards, an interception, rushed for 40 yards, and led the team on a game-winning touchdown drive, scoring with just 22 seconds left in the 4th quarter in the 16–13 win. In Week 14 against the Cleveland Browns, following Jackson's injury late in the first quarter, Huntley came into the game, threw 27 from 38, 270 yards, one touchdown, and almost led the Ravens to a comeback win, narrowly losing 22–24. The injury also prevented Jackson from playing the next week, and Huntley started his second career game in Week 15 against the Green Bay Packers, playing well, completing 28 of 40, for 215 yards, and two touchdowns, while rushing for another 73 yards and two touchdowns. The Ravens, however, lost this game 30–31, following a last-minute failed two-point conversion.

On December 24, 2021, it was reported that Huntley was expected to start again due to Jackson's injured ankle. On Christmas Day, Huntley was put on the Reserve/COVID-19 list rendering him unable to start against the Cincinnati Bengals. On December 30, 2021, Huntley was activated and named the starter for the Ravens against the Los Angeles Rams in Week 17, which resulted in a 19–20 loss.

2022 season
The Ravens placed an exclusive-rights free agent tender on Huntley on March 9, 2022. Huntley saw his first action of the season in Week 12, playing one snap in the 27–28 loss to the Jacksonville Jaguars. He was forced in the next week in the first quarter against the Denver Broncos after Lamar Jackson was forced out with a knee injury. In a low-scoring affair, Huntley led a game-winning drive in the final three minutes that he capped off with a two-yard touchdown run for the 10–9 win. He finished that game going 27 for 32 passing for 187 yards and an interception to go along with the 10 carries for 41 yards and the aforementioned touchdown. He started the next week against the Pittsburgh Steelers, but was knocked out of the game in the third quarter with a concussion and replaced by Anthony Brown, although the Ravens would still win 16–14. Huntley went 8 for 12 passing for 88 yards and rushed 9 times for 31 yards as well. 

On January 31, 2023, Huntley was named to the 2023 Pro Bowl as an injury replacement for Buffalo Bills quarterback Josh Allen.  His selection was met with considerable shock and questions as to its worthiness, owing to his comparatively poor regular-season statistics, as well as a small sample size of just four games as a starter.

2023 season
On March 15, 2023, the Ravens placed a tender on Huntley that will allow them match any other team's contract offer as they continue negotiations on a new contract.

NFL career statistics

Regular season

Postseason

References

External links

Baltimore Ravens bio
Utah Utes bio

1998 births
Living people
American football quarterbacks
Baltimore Ravens players
Hallandale High School alumni
People from Dania Beach, Florida
Players of American football from Florida
Sportspeople from Broward County, Florida
Utah Utes football players
American Conference Pro Bowl players